Albert Frank Pabian (1918–2015) was an American animator from Chuck Jones Enterprises and Mendelson-Melendez Productions. He animated for the Peanuts cartoon specials and films. He animated three Peanuts films in the 1970s and the 1980s. He also animated thirty-five Peanuts specials in the 1970, the 1980s,  the 1990s and the 2000s.

Films
Jerry, Jerry, Quite Contrary (1966), (short)--animator
Snoopy, Come Home (1972)--graphic blandishment
Race for Your Life, Charlie Brown (1977)--animator
Bon Voyage, Charlie Brown (and Don't Come Back!!) (1980)--animator

Television specials
Play It Again, Charlie Brown (1971)--graphic blandishment
You're Not Elected, Charlie Brown (1972)--graphic blandishment
There's No Time for Love, Charlie Brown (1973)--graphic blandishment
A Charlie Brown Thanksgiving (1973)--graphic blandishment
It's a Mystery, Charlie Brown (1974)--graphic blandishment
It's the Easter Beagle, Charlie Brown (1974)--animator
Yes, Virginia, There Is a Santa Claus (1974)--animator
Be My Valentine, Charlie Brown (1975)--animator
You're a Good Sport, Charlie Brown (1975)--assistant animator
It's Arbor Day, Charlie Brown (1976)--assistant animator
It's Your First Kiss, Charlie Brown (1977)--animator
What a Nightmare, Charlie Brown! (1978)--assistant animator
Raggedy Ann and Andy in The Great Santa Claus Caper (1978)--assistant animator
You're the Greatest, Charlie Brown (1979)--animator
She's a Good Skate, Charlie Brown (1980)--assistant animator
Life Is a Circus, Charlie Brown (1980)--assistant animator
It's Magic, Charlie Brown (1981)--assistant animator
No Man's Valley (1981)--animator
Someday You'll Find Her, Charlie Brown (1981)--assistant animator
A Charlie Brown Celebration (1981)--animator
Here Comes Garfield (1982)--animator
Is This Goodbye, Charlie Brown? (1983)--animator
It's an Adventure, Charlie Brown (1983)--animator
What Have We Learned, Charlie Brown? (1983)--animator
Garfield on the Town (1983)--animator
It's Flashbeagle, Charlie Brown (1984)--director
Garfield in the Rough (1984)--key assistant animator
The Romance of Betty Boop (1985)--animator
Snoopy's Getting Married, Charlie Brown (1985)--animator
Garfield's Halloween Adventure (1985)--assistant animator
You're a Good Man, Charlie Brown (1985)--animator
Happy New Year, Charlie Brown! (1985)--animator
Garfield in Paradise (1986)--assistant animator
Cathy (1987)--animator
Snoopy: The Musical (1988)--animator
Cathy's Last Resort (1988)--animator
It's the Girl in the Red Truck, Charlie Brown (1988)--graphic blandishment
Cathy's Valentine (1989)--animator
Why, Charlie Brown, Why? (1990)--animator
Snoopy's Reunion (1991)--animator
It's Spring Training, Charlie Brown (1992)--animator
Frosty Returns (1992)--animator
It Was My Best Birthday Ever, Charlie Brown (1997)--graphic blandishment
A Charlie Brown Valentine (2002)--clean-up artist
Charlie Brown's Christmas Tales (2002)--clean-up artist
I Want a Dog for Christmas, Charlie Brown (2003)--clean-up artist

Television series
The Charlie Brown and Snoopy Show (1983–1985)--animator (9 episodes)
This Is America, Charlie Brown (1990–1989)--animator (7 episodes)
Garfield and Friends (1988–1994)--animator (1 episode - 1994)

Video Games
Get Ready for School, Charlie Brown! (1995)--animator
Snoopy's Campfire Stories (1996)--animator

References

External links

1918 births
2015 deaths
American animators